Savely, Saveli or Saveliy is a Russian masculine given name. Its shortened versions include Savel and Sava. It may refer to:

Saveli Chitanava, Chairman of the State Committee for Ecology and the Environment of Abkhazia
Savely Govorkov, a fictional character in Soviet novels
Savely Kramarov (1934–1995), Russian comic actor
Savely Zeydenberg (1862–1942), Russian painter